In computing, tasklist is a command available in Microsoft Windows and in the AROS shell.

It is equivalent to the ps command in Unix and Unix-like operating systems and can also be compared with the Windows task manager (taskmgr).

Windows NT 4.0, the Windows 98 Resource Kit, the Windows 2000 Support Tools, and ReactOS include the similar tlist command. Additionally, Microsoft provides the similar PsList command as part of Windows Sysinternals.

Usage

Microsoft Windows
On Microsoft Windows tasklist shows all of the different local computer processes currently running. tasklist may also be used to show the processes of a remote system by using the command: tasklist /S "SYSTEM".

Optionally, they can be listed sorted by either the imagename, the PID or the amount of computer usage. But by default, they are sorted by chronological order:

See also
 Task manager
 nmon — a system monitor tool for the AIX and Linux operating systems.
 pgrep
 pstree
 top

References

Further reading

External links

 tasklist | Microsoft Docs

Windows communication and services
Windows administration
Task managers